Bezhan Zafarmal better known by his stage name DJ Besho is an Afghan singer, music producer, and composer. He released his first album Bargshat (برگشت) with Moby Media Group, including a number of collaborations. He is the first Afghan rap singer to introduce hip-hop to Afghanistan.

Early life
Zafarmal was born on May 10, 1977, in Kunduz, Afghanistan, the son of Dr Aziz And Mother Nasrin. He left Afghanistan when he was 10 years old. For a long time, the Afghan war forced him and his family to leave Afghanistan. They moved first to India, then China, followed by Russia, before finally settling just outside in Wiesbaden, (Germany).

Career
Zafarmal lived in Beijing for two years, where he was introduced to rap music. In 1992, he moved to Wiesbaden, (Germany) and in 2006 founded ANG -Afghan New Generations Labels. He worked in Afghanistan's government radio, television. He released his first album Bargshat with Moby Media Group; the album included a number of collaborations. His follow-up album Chashmak with singer Aris Parwiz included the lead single Gozstaa. He has continued making music album and releasing singles since then, and participated in many international music concerts. He has been the recipient of several international awards.

References

External links
 
 

DJs
1977 births
Living people
Afghan rappers
Afghan refugees
Afghan male singers
Persian-language singers
People from Kunduz Province
German people of Afghan descent
21st-century Afghan male singers